Asgat may refer to:
 Asgat, Sükhbaatar, Mongolia
 Asgat, Zavkhan, Mongolia